A dynameter is an instrument that measures the magnification of a telescope. It is usually a double-image micrometer used to measure the diameter of the image of the object glass. The magnifying power is found by comparing the actual diameter of the glass with the measured diameter of the image of the glass.

References
Dictionary entry for dynameter.
The DYNAMETER, archived from the original

Optical instruments
Measuring instruments
Astronomical imaging
Telescope instruments